Megachile singularis is a species of bee in the family Megachilidae. It was described by Cresson in 1865.

References

Singularis
Insects described in 1865